Charles Gilbert Mase (1895-1954), was a male English international table tennis player.

He won a bronze medal at the 1928 World Table Tennis Championships in the Swaythling Cup (men's team event).

See also
 List of England players at the World Team Table Tennis Championships
 List of World Table Tennis Championships medalists

References

English male table tennis players
1895 births
1954 deaths
World Table Tennis Championships medalists